Lycium schweinfurthii is a species of flowering plant in the family Solanaceae. The plant occurs in the south of the Mediterranean in Algeria, Tunisia, Libya, Egypt, Israel, Cyprus and southern Aegean (Crete, Karpathos, Rhodes) and Sicily and Pantelleria.

References

schweinfurthii
Taxa named by Carl Lebrecht Udo Dammer